Brady Lake may refer to:

Brady Creek Reservoir, also known as "Brady Lake", in McCulloch County, Texas, United States
Brady Lake, Ohio, a village in the United States
Brady Lake (Ohio), its lake